Frasera neglecta (syn. Swertia neglecta) is a species of flowering plant in the gentian family known by the common name pine green gentian.

The plant is endemic to California, where it is known from the Western Transverse Ranges in the Greater Los Angeles region, and the Southern California Coast Ranges.

It grows in chaparral, oak woodlands, and other habitats.

Description
Frasera neglecta is a perennial herb producing one or more erect stems from a rosetted base, reaching up to roughly half a meter tall. The leaves are linear or lance-shaped and green with white margins; the largest leaves at the base of the plant can reach 20 centimeters in length.

The inflorescence is a dense panicle atop the stem, sometimes interrupted into a series of clusters of flowers. Each flower has a calyx of four pointed sepals and a corolla of four pointed lobes each up to 1.5 centimeters long. The corolla is greenish white with purple streaks. There are four stamens tipped with large anthers and a central ovary.

External links
Jepson Manual Treatment of Frasera neglecta
Frasera neglecta — U.C. Photo gallery

neglecta
Endemic flora of California
Natural history of the California chaparral and woodlands
Natural history of the California Coast Ranges
Natural history of the Santa Monica Mountains
Natural history of the Transverse Ranges
Flora without expected TNC conservation status